Abraxas illuminata is a species of moth belonging to the family Geometridae. It was described by Warren in 1894. It is known from Sikkim and Darjeeling in India, as well as China and Taiwan.

The wingspan is about 47 mm.

The larvae have been recorded feeding on Celastrus hindsii.

References

Abraxini
Moths of Asia
Moths described in 1894